Fleatown is the name of two places in the USA:

 Fleatown, Ohio
 former name of Federalsburg, Delaware